The 2006 season was the 94th year of competitive soccer in the United States.

National team

Men

Senior

The home team or the team that is designated as the home team is listed in the left column; the away team is in the right column.

Women

Senior

Four Nations Tournament

Algarve Cup

International Friendlies

Peace Queen Cup

Gold Cup

Major League Soccer

Tables
Purple indicates Supporters' Shield clinched 
Yellow indicates Regular Season Runners-up clinched 
Green indicates playoff berth clinched

Eastern Conference

Western Conference

Playoffs

MLS Cup

USL Division 1

Table

Playoffs

Final

USL Second Division

Table
Purple indicates regular season champion 
Green indicates playoff berth clinched

1New Hampshire was penalized 1 point for use of an ineligible player in a game.

Playoffs

Final

Lamar Hunt U.S. Open Cup

Home teams listed on top of bracket

Final

American clubs in international competitions

Los Angeles Galaxy

New England Revolution

References
 American competitions at RSSSF
 American national team matches at RSSSF

 
Seasons in American soccer